Annes Jul is a 2006 studio album released by Danish singer Anne Gadegaard. The title means "Anne's Christmas", and the album is a collection of Christmas themed songs. The album consists of ten songs, four of which were released as singles: "Peek-A-Boo", "Glædelig Jul Til Dig Fra Mig", "Når Det Bli'r Midnat" and "Tid Til Du Skal Tilgi". The album was later rereleased with "Gi Mig Alt", "Kukkelu" and "Min Veninde" added as bonus tracks. In 2008, plans to release another album were cancelled, leaving Annes Jul the last Anne Gadegaard studio album to date.

Track listing
(Titles in brackets are for rough translation purposes only)
Peek-A-Boo 
Nytårsparty (New Year Party)
Glædelig Jul Til Dig Fra Mig (Merry Christmas To You from Me)
Hvis Jeg Får Det Her Til Jul (If I Make It This Christmas)
Tid Til Du Skal Tilgi (Time For Your Forgiveness)
Hjem Til Jul (Home for Christmas)
Gi'en Del Af Det Du Har Til Jul (Have Part of it 'Til Christmas)
Et Lille Bitte Lys (A Tiny Candle)
Julen Bor I Os Selv (Christmas Living in Ourselves)
Når Det Bli'r Midnat (When It's Getting to Midnight)
Gi Mig Alt (Give me Everything) (Special edition only) 
Kukkelu (Special edition only)
Min Veninde (My Friend) (Special edition only)

Anne Gadegaard albums
2006 Christmas albums
Christmas albums by Danish artists
Pop Christmas albums
Danish-language albums